Arnold Town Football Club is a football club based in Arnold, Nottinghamshire, England.

History
Arnold Town was formed in 1989 by a merger of Arnold F.C. and Arnold Kingswell, adopting the yellow of Arnold and the blue of Kingswell as club colours. The new club took over from Arnold in the Central Midlands League Supreme Division, finishing third in their first season. The 1992–93 season saw the club win the Notts Senior Cup, beating Rainworth Miners Welfare 3–1 in the final, as well as winning the Supreme Division, earning promotion to Division One of the Northern Counties East League. They went on to win Division One at the first attempt, earning promotion to the Premier Division. The 1994–95 season saw them finish second in the Premier Division and win the President's Cup.

In the 1995–96 season, Arnold Town successfully defended the Notts Senior Cup for a second time after beating Boots Athletic 2–0, The following season saw the same two clubs contest the final, with Arnold winning 1–0. A fourth Cup was won in 1998–99 with a 2–1 win over Hucknall Town, and a fifth came in 2004–05 when Eastwood Town were beaten 1–0. In 2012–13 the club finished 19th in the Premier Division following a 10-point deduction due to financial problems, and were relegated to the East Midlands Counties League. In 2018–19 they finished bottom of the East Midlands Counties League and were relegated to the Central Midlands League South Division.

Season-by-season record

Ground
Arnold Town initially played at the King George V Ground, usually referred to as Gedling Road, until the 2007–08 season. They had hoped to move to the Eagle Valley Complex at the start of the 2008–09 season, but due to delays in the completion of the ground, they played their home matches at various grounds including Gedling Miners Welfare, Gedling Town, Carlton Town and Dunkirk. 

The Eagle Valley complex was completed in 2009, with the first match played on 24 January against Thackley resulting in a 3–2 win for Arnold in front of a crowd of 238.

Honours
Northern Counties East League
Division One Champions 1993–94
President's Cup winners 1994–95
Central Midlands League
Supreme Division champions 1992–93
Notts Senior Cup
Winners 1992–93, 1995–96, 1996–97, 1998–99, 2004–05
Wakefield Cup
Winners 1989–90

Records
Most appearances: Lee Broster, 364
Best FA Cup performance: Fourth qualifying round, 2002–03
Best FA Vase performance: Fifth round, 2001–02, 2005–06

See also
Arnold Town F.C. players
Arnold Town F.C. managers

References

External links
Official website

 
Football clubs in England
Association football clubs established in 1989
1989 establishments in England
Central Midlands Football League
Northern Counties East Football League
East Midlands Counties Football League